The 2022 Arizona House of Representatives elections were held November 8, 2022. Voters in each of Arizona's 30 legislative districts elected two state representatives to the Arizona House of Representatives. The elections coincided with the elections for other offices, including the  U.S Senate, U.S. House of Representatives, and state senate. The primary elections were set for August 2022.

Term-limited
District 5: Regina Cobb (R)
District 11: Mark Finchem (R) (running for secretary of state)
District 20: Diego Espinoza (D) (running for state senate)
District 25: Russell Bowers (R) (running for state senate)
District 27: Reginald Bolding (D) (running for secretary of state)
District 29: Richard C. Andrade (D) (running for state senate)

Retirements
District 2: Daniel Hernández Jr. (D), retiring to run for the U.S. House of Representatives in Arizona's 2nd congressional district in the 2022 election.
District 4: Brian Fernandez (D) is retiring to run for Arizona Senate
District 6: Walter Blackman (R), retiring to run for the U.S. House of Representatives in Arizona's 2nd congressional district in the 2022 election.
District 7: Jasmine Blackwater-Nygren (D) is retiring.
District 9: Pamela Hannley (D) is retiring.
District 10: Morgan Abraham (D) is retiring to run for Arizona Senate
District 12: Jake Hoffman (R) is retiring to run for Arizona Senate
District 13: Joanne Osborne (R) is retiring to run for Arizona Senate
District 15: Steve Kaiser (R) is retiring to run for Arizona Senate
District 17: Jeff Weninger (R) is retiring to run for state treasurer
District 18: Mitzi Epstein (D) is retiring to run for Arizona Senate
District 18: Jennifer Jermaine (D) is retiring
District 20: Shawnna Bolick (R) is retiring to run for secretary of state
District 22: Frank Carroll (R) is retiring to run for Arizona Senate
District 23: John Kavanagh (R) is retiring to run for Arizona Senate
District 25: Michelle Udall (R) is retiring for Arizona Superintendent of Public Instruction.
District 28: Kelli Butler (D) is retiring.
District 29: Cesar Chavez (D) is retiring to run for Arizona Senate
District 30: Robert Meza (D) is retiring.

Predictions

Summary

Results

District 1

District 2

District 3

District 4

District 5

District 6

District 7

District 8

District 9

District 10

District 11

District 12

District 13

District 14

District 15

District 16

District 17

District 18

District 19

District 20

District 21

District 22

District 23

District 24

District 25

District 26

District 27

District 28

District 29

District 30

See also

 2022 Arizona elections
 2022 Arizona Senate election

References

External links

House of Representatives
Arizona House of Representatives elections
Arizona House